Gruchet-le-Valasse is a commune in the Seine-Maritime department of the Normandy region in northern France.

Geography

Heraldry

Population

Places of interest
 Several sixteenth century houses.
 The church of St-Thomas, dating from the fourteenth century.
 The twelfth century abbey de Gruchet-le-Valasse.
 The nineteenth century Hôtel de Ville (town hall).

See also
Communes of the Seine-Maritime department

References

External links

 Official website of Gruchet-le-Valasse 

Communes of Seine-Maritime